Best New Artist is a Grammy Award. It may also refer to:
BET Award for Best New Artist
Grammy Award for Best New Artist
Latin Grammy Award for Best New Artist
MTV Video Music Award for Best New Artist
MTV Europe Music Award for Best New Act
MTV Video Music Award Japan for Best New Artist
Mnet Asian Music Award for Best New Artist (Solo or Group)
New Zealand Music Award for Best New Artist
NAACP Image Award for Outstanding New Artist
Soul Train Music Award for Best New Artist

See also
Breakthrough Artist of the Year (disambiguation)